Jun-young, also spelled Joon-young, is a Korean unisex given name. It was the tenth-most popular name for baby boys in South Korea in 1980, rising to sixth place by 1990. Its meaning depends  on the hanja used to write each syllable of the name. There are 34 hanja with the reading "jun" and 34 hanja with the reading "young" on the South Korean government's official list of hanja which may be registered for use in given names.

People

Entertainers
Park Junyoung (born 1987), South Korean singer in Japan
Nucksal (born Lee Jun-yeong, 1987), South Korean rapper
Seo Jun-young (born Kim Sang-gu, 1987), South Korean actor
Jung Joon-young (born 1989), South Korean rock singer
Lee Jun-young (entertainer) (born 1997), South Korean singer, member of boy band U-KISS
Profit (gamer) (born Park Joon-yeong, 1999), South Korean Overwatch player

Sportspeople
Lee Jun-yeong, South Korean basketball player
Bang Jun-yeong (born 1965), South Korean swimmer
Lee Jun-young (footballer) (born 1982), South Korean football forward
Yoo Joon-young (born 1990), South Korean football midfielder
Jang Jun-young (born 1993), South Korean football defender (K-League Challenge)
Kim Jun-young (footballer) (born 1999), South Korean football midfielder (Belarusian Premier League)

Other
Kim Jun-young (born 1951), South Korean economist
June-Young Soh (born 1965), South Korean musical director
Park Jun-young (government official, born 1967), South Korean Deputy Minister of Oceans and Fisheries since 2020
Ki Jun-young (born 1972), South Korean female writer

Fictional characters
Park Jun-yeong, from the 2017 television series Prison Playbook
Do Joon-young, from the 2018 television series My Mister
Oh Joon-yeong, from the 2022 television series All of Us Are Dead

See also
List of Korean given names

References

Korean unisex given names